A Wonderful Beast is the fifth studio album by Beat Happening's lead vocalist Calvin Johnson. It was released on October 12, 2018 through K Records.

Track listing

References

2018 albums
K Records albums
Albums produced by Patrick Carney